Emilio Martínez may refer to:
 Emilio Martínez (footballer, born 1981)
 Emilio Martínez (footballer, born 2003)

See also
 Emilio Martínez-Lázaro, Spanish filmmaker